A referendum concerning whether daylight saving should be continued in New South Wales was put to voters in conjunction with the state election on 1 May 1976 and was carried with a comfortable majority.

Background
Daylight saving had been introduced in Australia at the end of World War I, from 1 January to 31 March 1917. It was re-introduced during World War II for 3 summers from 1 January 1942. It was first introduced in peace time on 31 October 1971. Neither the governing Liberal/Country coalition nor the Labor opposition campaigned on the issue, with the debate taken up by single interest organisations.

Yes case
The Daylight Savings Association argued that daylight savings (1) reduced power consumption (2) led to more leisure time for outdoor activities and (3) reduced the road toll.

No case
The Anti-daylight Savings Association's case was that (1) people had difficulty sleeping because their houses did not cool until later in the night (2) country children had to travel to school in the dark and return in the heat of the afternoon (3) Chickens and dairy cows were less productive because of the change of hours of farm hands. Additional arguments put were that children were irritated in the afternoon heat causing more difficulty for young mothers and that adapting to change was difficult for old people.

The question

The voting paper contained the following directions to the elector:

Results

See also 
 Referendums in New South Wales
 Referendums in Australia

References

1976 referendums
Referendums in New South Wales
November 1976 events
1970s in New South Wales
Daylight saving time in Australia